This was a new event in the ITF Women's Circuit.

Asia Muhammad won the title, defeating Eri Hozumi in the final, 6–4, 6–3.

Seeds

Main draw

Finals

Top half

Bottom half

References 
 Main draw

Canberra Tennis International - Singles
2015 in Australian tennis
2015